Dei svarte hestane is a 1951 Norwegian drama film directed by Hans Jacob Nilsen and Sigval Maartmann-Moe, and starring Hans Jacob Nilsen, Eva Sletto and Ottar Vicklund. It is based on the novel Dei svarte hestane by Tarjei Vesaas.

Ambros Fornes (Nilsen) owns two large farms and runs a coaching house. On his farm he has four fit and shiny black horses. These horses eventually become the centre of his life, because his young and beautiful wife, Lisle (Sletto), is unable to love him like he loves her. She can not forget Bjørneskinn (Vicklund), the blonde boy she was once in love with. He wanted to be a poet, but decided on a life on the road when he could not have her.

When the old boyfriend one day returns, it leads to a dramatic showdown. The family is about to fall apart, which will be particularly hard for Kjell, Ambros and Lisle's young son. He end up in a conflict of loyalty between his parents, and has great difficulties dealing with the situation.

Cast
Hans Jacob Nilsen as Ambros Førnes
Eva Sletto	as Lisle Førnes
Olav Strandli as Kjell Førnes
Mette Lange-Nielsen as Viv Førnes
Claus Wiese as  Rolv Gangstad
Ottar Wicklund as Bjørnskinn
Else-Merete Heiberg as Frida Nordbø
Roy Bjørnstad as Falte
Jens Bolling as Henrik Nordbø
Lasse Kolstad as En bondegutt
Eva Nilsen as Mabb Førnes
Alf Ramsøy as Leiv Førnes
Ingolf Rogde as Brankestad
Espen Skjønberg as Ola Nordbø
Liv Uchermann Selmer as Inger

External links
 
 

1951 films
1951 drama films
Films based on works by Tarjei Vesaas
Norwegian drama films
Norwegian black-and-white films
Films directed by Sigval Maartmann-Moe